Daniel Boone, Trail Blazer is a 1956 American Western film co-produced and directed by Albert C. Gannaway and Ismael Rodríguez and starring Bruce Bennett, Lon Chaney Jr. and Faron Young. The film was shot in Trucolor in Mexico. It was released by Republic Pictures at the height of the Davy Crockett, King of the Wild Frontier craze.

Plot
Set in 1775, during the American War of Independence, the settlement of Boonesborough, Kentucky, is besieged by both hostile Shawnee Indian tribes and the British. Frontiersman Daniel Boone and his family must fight for survival when overtures of peace fail and culminate in a frontal assault on the fort.

Cast

Bruce Bennett as Daniel Boone
Lon Chaney Jr. as Blackfish
Faron Young as Faron Callaway
 Kem Dibbs as Simon Girty
Damian O'Flynn as Andy Callaway
Jacqueline Evans as Rebecca Boone
 Nancy Rodman as Susannah Boone
Freddy Fernández as Israel Boone
 Carol Kelly as Jamima Boone
Eduardo Noriega as Squire Boone
Fred Kohler Jr. as Kenton
Gordon Mills as John Holder
Claudio Brook as James Boone
Joe Ainley as Gen. Hamilton
Lee Morgan as Smitty

Soundtrack

Albert C. Gannaway composed the music for three songs for the film, with lyrics by Hal Levy.

 "Long Green Valley" (sung by Faron Young)
 "Stand Firm in the Faith"
 "Dan'l Boone"

See also
 List of films in the public domain in the United States

Notes

External links

1956 films
American biographical films
1956 Western (genre) films
Republic Pictures films
Films set in 1775
Films set in Kentucky
American Revolutionary War films
American Western (genre) films
American historical adventure films
1950s historical adventure films
Trucolor films
1950s English-language films
Films directed by Albert C. Gannaway
Films directed by Ismael Rodríguez
1950s American films